Daniela Andrade Dougherty (born 4 April 1992) is a Guatemalan footballer who plays as a midfielder. She has been a member of the Guatemala women's national team.

See also
List of Guatemala women's international footballers

References

1992 births
Living people
Women's association football midfielders
Guatemalan women's footballers
Sportspeople from Guatemala City
Guatemala women's international footballers
Central American Games bronze medalists for Guatemala
Central American Games medalists in football
South Florida Bulls women's soccer players
Guatemalan expatriate footballers
Guatemalan expatriate sportspeople in the United States
Expatriate women's soccer players in the United States